Hyoseris is a genus of flowering plants in the family Asteraceae. It is native to the Mediterranean region from Portugal to Israel, with a few species extending as far north as Germany.

 Species

References

External links
 Taxonomy
 Taxonomicon

Asteraceae genera